Bandusia may refer to:

A spring near Venusia and the subject of The Spring of Bandusia, a poem by Horace
597 Bandusia, an asteroid